Natz may refer to:

People
 Jack Natz, American bass guitarist and vocalist

Places
 Natz-Schabs, Italy